Three's Company is an American sitcom that aired from 1977 to 1984 on ABC.

Series overview

Episodes

Season 1 (1977)
The two early versions of the pilot were recorded in March and November of 1976; season 1 was recorded from January to March 1977.

Season 2 (1977–78)

Season 3 (1978–79)

Season 4 (1979–80)

Season 5 (1980–81)

Season 6 (1981–82)

Season 7 (1982–83)

Season 8 (1983–84)

References

Notelist

External links
 
 

Episodes
Three's Company